The Chasle YC-100 Hirondelle is a French single seat microlight designed in the 1980s.

Design and development
Yves Chasle worked as an Aérospatiale stress engineer and independently designed several light aircraft, starting with the Chasle YC-12 Tourbillon. His YC-100 Hirondelle is a largely wooden framed and fabric covered single-seat sports aircraft of conventional pusher layout. It has a strut braced high wing of constant chord with styrofoam ribs. The fuselage of the Hirondelle is a slender, rectangular cross-sectioned beam with the pilot's seat upon it ahead of the wing leading edge. The fin is broad and straight-tapered and the horizontal tail is attached to the fuselage underside. The Hirondelle has a short, fixed tricycle undercarriage.

Its first flight was on 1 May 1985, powered by a  König SC 430 engine, a 430 cc (26.2 cu in), air-cooled, three-cylinder radial. The second prototype, built in Brazil, had a  JPX PUL 425/503 engine, a 212 cc (12.9 cu in) air-cooled flat-twin two stroke.

The number built is uncertain; in 2009 two examples, both YC-100s, appeared on European civil registers, one in Spain and one in France.

Variants
Plans for these were available but only the YC-100 is known to have been built.
YC-100 As described below but could also be fitted with a  JPX PUL 425/503.
Recommended engines were the JPX PUL 865, the  König SD 570 or the  KFM 107ER.
YC-110 Shorter span ( wings with NACA 23015 section and Junkers type, two part, full span auxiliary airfoil ailerons or flaperons. Recommended engines as YC-100 and also the König SD 570. 
YC-111 Longer span YC-110.

Specifications (YC-100 prototype)

References

Ultralight aircraft
1980s French sport aircraft
Chasle aircraft
High-wing aircraft
Single-engined pusher aircraft
Aircraft first flown in 1985